From 1961 to 1966, the English rock band the Beatles performed all over the Western world. They began performing live in England in 1961 and continued in various clubs during their visit to Hamburg, West Germany, until 1962, with a line-up of John Lennon, Paul McCartney, George Harrison, Stuart Sutcliffe and Pete Best. Following Sutcliffe's departure (and subsequent death of a brain haemorrhage), the Beatles continued performing throughout 1962, most notably at The Cavern Club in Liverpool, where they were discovered by Brian Epstein and George Martin. After firing Best and hiring Ringo Starr, the Beatles performed a series of concert tours throughout the UK in 1963, before they left for the US in early 1964. As Beatlemania and the British Invasion came into full force, they began a world tour and continued to perform in the UK and US throughout 1965, including a well-known performance at Shea Stadium in New York City.

In 1966, following a controversial tour of Germany, Japan and the Philippines and a tour of the US (which was plagued with backlash due to Lennon's "more popular than Jesus" comment), the Beatles ceased performing live due to being fed up with touring and became a studio-only band. Their last commercial performance was at San Francisco's Candlestick Park on 29 August. It marked the end of a four-year period dominated by almost nonstop touring that included over 1,400 concert appearances internationally. The group made no more public appearances until 30 January 1969, when they performed an unannounced rooftop concert at their Apple Corps headquarters in London. Numerous documentaries about their live performances have been made before and after their break-up, including The Beatles at Shea Stadium (1965) and The Beatles: Eight Days a Week (2016).

Below is a list of all known live performances the Beatles undertook during their career as a band. Any appearances with members that differ from the best-known line-up (Lennon, McCartney, Harrison and Starr) are marked accordingly.

List of live performances

1961

Stuart Sutcliffe left the group by the end of 1960; the Beatles line-up was John Lennon, Paul McCartney, George Harrison and Pete Best.  All 1961 live performances listed include Pete Best.

1962
All 1962 live performances listed include Pete Best up until 15 August 1962.  Ringo Starr joins officially as of 18 August.

1963

1964

1965

1966

1969

Notes

Summary
Between February 1961 and August 1963, the Beatles made a total of at least 275 appearances at the Cavern, more than any other venue.

References

Citations

Sources
 
 
 
 
 

 
1960s in music
1960s-related lists
Lists of concert tours